Ayavuya Myoli (born 8 June 1990) is a South African cricketer. He was included in the North West squad for the 2016 Africa T20 Cup. In September 2019, he was named in Gauteng's squad for the 2019–20 CSA Provincial T20 Cup.

References

External links
 

1990 births
Living people
South African cricketers
Border cricketers
Griqualand West cricketers
KwaZulu-Natal cricketers
North West cricketers
Sportspeople from Qonce